Widdop is a surname. Notable people with the surname include:
 Dennis Widdop (1931–2016), English footballer
 Gareth Widdop (born 1989), English professional rugby league footballer 
 Walter Widdop (1892–1949), British operatic tenor